The Staufenberg is a mountain near Vellmar in Kassel, Hesse, Germany.

Mountains of Hesse